Cormac McCarthy is an American novelist, playwright, and screenwriter. McCarthy has written twelve novels, spanning the Southern Gothic, Western, and post-apocalyptic genres, as well as multiple short-stories, screenplays, plays, and an essay.

In 1985, he published Blood Meridian, which received a lukewarm response. The novel has since gained great esteem and is often seen as his magnum opus — some have even labelled it the Great American Novel.

Novels

Short fiction

Essays

Screenplays

Plays

Dramatic adaptations
Released 
Television:
 The Gardener's Son (airdate January 1977) was broadcast as part of a series for PBS. McCarthy wrote the screenplay upon request for director Richard Pearce. The screenplay was published as a book in 1996.
 An adaptation of McCarthy's play The Sunset Limited (2006) aired on HBO in February 2011,  starring Tommy Lee Jones (who also directed) and Samuel L. Jackson.
Feature films:
 All the Pretty Horses (2000), directed by Billy Bob Thornton, starring Matt Damon and Penélope Cruz. Adapted from McCarthy's 1992 novel.
 No Country for Old Men (2007), Academy Award-winning film directed by the Coen brothers and starring Tommy Lee Jones, Josh Brolin, and Javier Bardem. Adapted from McCarthy's 2005 novel.
 The Road (2009), directed by John Hillcoat and adapted by Joe Penhall. Starring Viggo Mortensen as the father, Kodi Smit-McPhee as the boy, Charlize Theron as the wife, and Robert Duvall as the old man. Adapted from McCarthy's 2006 novel.
 Child of God (2013), co-written and directed by James Franco and premiered at the 70th Venice International Film Festival. Adapted from McCarthy's 1973 novel.
Short films:
 In 2009, Outer Dark was made into a 15-minute short film (directed by Stephen Imwalle) released on the U.S. festival circuit.

Rumored
 A film adaptation of Blood Meridian has been rumored for years; James Franco, Todd Field, Scott Rudin, and Ridley Scott have been connected at one point or another to the project, which has fallen through at least twice.

See also
List of awards received by Cormac McCarthy

References

External links

Bibliographies by writer
Novels by Cormac McCarthy
Works by Cormac McCarthy